Paeonians were an ancient Indo-European people that dwelt in Paeonia. Paeonia was an old country whose location was to the north of Ancient Macedonia, to the south of Dardania, to the west of Thrace and to the east of Illyria, most of their land was in the Axios (or Vardar) river basin, roughly in what is today North Macedonia.

Geography 
The Paeonians lived from the middle to the lower Vardar river basin in antiquity. The first Paeonian settlement to be mentioned in antiquity is Amydon by Homer in the Iliad. To the north and west the Paeonians bordered Illyrian peoples but these borders were unstable. In particular, the border with the Dardani seems to have shifted several times between Gradsko (Stobi) and Bylazora. The capture of Bylazora in 217 BCE by Philip V partly stabilized the northern Dardanian-Paeonian frontier. To their east, the Paeonians bordered Thracian peoples along the Bregalnica river, which seems to have formed the natural border between the Maedi and the Paeonians. Along the Lakavica river, a left-bank tributary of the Bregalnica, it is most likely Paeonian settlements were distributed. Their territory extended to the southeast up to the upper Strumica river basin (roughly the area of modern Strumica municipality) and bordered Sintice. An important Paeonian settlement in this region was Doberus which is mentioned in 429 BCE in the Odrysian campaign against Macedon by Sitalces. To their west and southwest along the Crna Reka river, the Paeonians who themselves proably occupied the lower Crna Reka border a number of Illyrian and upper Macedonian or Pelagonian peoples, while to the south the Brygian town of Skydra or Kydra was situated. To the south, Paeonians bordered Macedonians. Before 1000 BCE, Paeonians must have settled in the lower Vardar basin as far south as Mygdonia where Strabo places them in an area known as Amphaxitis. The expansion of the Macedonian state during the 4th century BCE resulted in the foundation of several new cities in southern Paeonia including Idomenae and Antigonia.

Ethnolinguistic kinship 

Some modern scholars consider the Paeonians to have been of either Thracian, or of mixed Thraco-Illyrian origins. According to Radoslav Katičić, the prevailing opinion is that they were of “Illyrian” origin, in the sense that they belonged to same linguistic grouping as the people of the north-western Balkans, while some scholars have proposed a Greek origin and that their language was an ancient Greek dialect. The possibility that they took part in the Greek migration, remained behind on the route and consequently spoke a Greek dialect or a lost Indo-European language closely related to Greek cannot be ruled out. According to the national legend, they were Teucrian colonists from Troy. Homer speaks of Paeonians from the Axios fighting on the side of the Trojans, but the Iliad does not mention whether the Paeonians were kin to the Trojans. Homer calls the Paeonian leader Pyraechmes (parentage unknown);  later on in the Iliad (Book 21), Homer mentions a second leader, Asteropaeus, son of Pelagon.

Pausanias described that Paeon, the eponymous ancestor of the Paionians, was a brother of Epeius and Aetolus, the eponymous ancestors of the Epeians of Elis and the Aetolians respectively. According to Irwin L. Merker, this genealogy shows that the Ancient Greeks considered the Paionians to be of Hellenic stock. Their place-name has several cognates in Greece such as Παιονίδαι (Paeonidai), a deme of the tribe Leontis in Attica. A place in the Argolid also has the same name.

Paeonian is considered a Paleo-Balkan language but this is only a geographical grouping, not a genealogical one. Modern linguists are uncertain as to the classification of Paeonian, due to the extreme scarcity of surviving materials in the language, with numerous hypotheses having been suggested:

 Irwin L. Merker considers Paeonian closely related to Greek (and ancient Macedonian if it was a distinct language from ancient Greek), namely a Hellenic language, but with a great deal of Thracian and Illyrian influence as a result of their proximity to them. Furthermore, the Paeonian kings issued coins from the time of Philip II of Macedon onwards, using the Greek alphabet. All the names of the Paeonian Kings that have come down to us are, in fact, explainable with and clearly related to Greek (Agis, Ariston, Audoleon, Lycceius, etc.), a fact that, according to Irwin L. Merker, puts into question the theories of Thracian and Illyrian connections.
Dimitar Dečev and Susan Wise Bauer consider a Thracian hypothesis.
 Wilhelm Tomaschek and Paul Kretschmer suggest an Illyrian affiliation.
Francesco Villari considers a Thraco-Illyrian hypothesis.
 Athenaeus seems to have connected the Paeonian language to the barely-attested Mysian language. Mysian was possibly a member of the Anatolian branch in the Indo-European language family or a member of the Armeno-Phrygian languages (languages of the Bryges, Phrygians, Western and Eastern Mushki and ancient Armenians), another branch of the Indo-European languages, possibly more closely related to the Hellenic branch (Greek and Ancient Macedonian languages).

Culture

Politics 
The Paeonians included several independent tribes, all later united under the rule of a single king to form the Kingdom of Paeonia.

Religion 
They worshipped the Sun in the form of a small round disk fixed on the top of a pole.
They adopted the cult of Dionysus, known amongst them as Dyalus or Dryalus, and Herodotus mentions that the Thracian and Paeonian women offered sacrifice to Queen Artemis (probably Bendis).

Manners and Customs 
Little is known of their manners and customs.

Drink 
They drank barley beer and various decoctions made from plants and herbs.

Women 
The women were famous for their industry. In this connection Herodotus tells the story that Darius, having seen at Sardis a beautiful Paeonian woman carrying a pitcher on her head, leading a horse to drink, and spinning flax, all at the same time, inquired who she was. Having been informed that she was a Paeonian, he sent instructions to Megabazus, commander in Thrace, to deport two tribes of the nation without delay to Asia. An inscription, discovered in 1877 at Olympia on the base of a statue, states that it was set up by the community of the Paeonians in honor of their king and founder Dropion. Another king, whose name appears as Lyppeius on a fragment of an inscription found at Athens relating to a treaty of alliance, is no doubt identical with the Lycceius or Lycpeius of Paeonian coins.

History

Paeonian Country 
The country of Paeonians had some important resources - it was rich in gold and a bituminous kind of wood (or stone, which burst into a blaze when in contact with water) called tanrivoc (or tsarivos).

During the Persian invasion of Greece they conquered Paeonians as far as the Lake Prasias, including the Paeoplae and Siropaiones. Part of them were deported from Paeonia to Asia.

Before the reign of Darius Hystaspes, they had made their way as far east as Perinthus in Thrace on the Propontis. At one time all Mygdonia, together with Crestonia, was subject to them. When Xerxes crossed Chalcidice on his way to Therma (later renamed Thessalonica), he is said to have marched through Paeonian territory. They occupied the entire valley of the Axios (Vardar) as far inland as Stobi, the valleys to the east of it as far as the Strymon and the country round Astibus and the river of the same name, with the water of which they anointed their kings. Emathia, roughly the district between the Haliacmon and Axios, was once called Paeonia; and Pieria and Pelagonia were inhabited by Paeonians. 

As a consequence of Macedonian power growth, and under pressure from their Thracian neighbors, their territory was considerably diminished, and in historical times was limited to the lands north of Macedonia and from Illyria to the Strymon. In 355–354 BC, Philip II of Macedon took advantage of the death of King Agi of Paeonia and campaigned against them in order to conquer them. So the southern part of ancient Paeonia was annexed by the ancient kingdom of Macedon and was named "Macedonian Paeonia"; this section included the cities Astraion (later Stromnitsa), Stenae (near modern Demir Kapija), Antigoneia (near modern Negotino), etc.

Decline 
In 280 BC, the Gallic invaders under Brennus ravaged the land of the Paeonians, who, being further hard pressed by the Dardani, had no alternative but to join the Macedonians. Despite their combined efforts, however, the Paeonians and Macedonians were defeated. Paeonia consolidated again but, in 217 BC, the Macedonian king Philip V of Macedon (220–179 BC), the son of Demetrius II, succeeded in uniting and incorporating into his empire the separate regions of Dassaretia and Paeonia. A mere 70 years later (in 168 BC), Roman legions conquered Macedon in turn, and a new and much larger Roman province bearing this name was formed. Paeonia around the Axios formed the second and third districts respectively of the newly constituted Roman province of Macedonia. Centuries later under Diocletian, Paeonia and Pelagonia formed a province called Macedonia Secunda or Macedonia Salutaris, belonging to the Praetorian prefecture of Illyricum.

Tribes 
The Paeonian tribes (five or eight) were:
 Agrianes (also, Agriani and Agrii) (it is also claimed that this tribe was Thracian)
 Almopians (also Almopioi)
 Derrones (also Derroni) (it is also claimed that this tribe was Thracian)
 Doberes
 Laeaeans (also Laeaei and Laiai)
 Odomantes (also Odomanti) (it is also claimed that this tribe was Thracian)
 Paeoplae
 Siropaiones

See also 
 Paeonia (kingdom)
 List of ancient Daco-Thracian peoples and tribes

References

Sources

Further reading

External links 
 https://www.livius.org/articles/people/paeones/

 
Indo-European peoples
Geography of ancient Paeonia